Blackheart Revolution is the third full-length album by American industrial rock band Genitorturers.

Track listing
  "Revolution" – 4:33
  "Kabangin' All Night" – 3:39
  "Devil In A Bottle" – 3:50
  "Louder" – 3:46
  "Falling Stars" – 4:01
  "Take It" – 3:48
  "Confessions Of A Blackheart" – 5:12
  "Cum Junkie" – 3:57
  "Vampire Lover" – 5:04
  "Tell Me" – 4:02

Personnel 
 Gen - lead vocals
 Evil D - bass, guitars, backing vocals, keys, programming
 Bizz - guitars, backing vocals
 Mark Prator - drums On "Louder", Take It", & "Vampire Lover"
 Joey Letz - drums on "Devil In a Bottle", "Falling Stars", & "Tell Me"
 Angel Bartolotta - drums On "Kabangin' All Night"

Genitorturers albums
2000 albums
Albums produced by Scott Humphrey